Monthermé is a commune in the Ardennes department in northern France.

Geography
The river Semois (or Semoy) joins the river Meuse in Monthermé.

Population

See also
Communes of the Ardennes department

References

Communes of Ardennes (department)
Ardennes communes articles needing translation from French Wikipedia